Book of Shadows is a book of religious texts and instructions for magical rituals in Wicca.

Book of Shadows may also refer to:

 Book of Shadows (Charmed), its fictional equivalent from the television series Charmed
 Book of Shadows: Blair Witch 2, a 2000 American horror film and the sequel to The Blair Witch Project
 Book of Shadows (album), an album by Zakk Wylde
 Book of Shadows, an album by Tony Martin
 Book of Shadows, a duology of albums by Dragonland
 Book of Shadows (Image Comics), a comic book by Mark Chadbourn and Bo Hampton, published by Image Comics
 Book of Shadows (biography), a 1998 biography by Phyllis Corrat
 Corpse Party: Book of Shadows, a 2011 survival horror adventure video game for PlayStation Portable and iOS
Corpse Party: Book of Shadows (film), a 2016 Japanese horror film loosely based on the video game